Air Commodore Mukhtar Ahmad Dogar (15 May 1922 – 5 June 2004) was the Pakistan Air Force bomber pilot and aerial warfare specialist who was the first military person to receive the Pakistani military award Sitara-e-Jurat. 

A World War II veteran, he is known for his participation in Indo-Pakistani War of 1947 most notably for the "Defenceless Dakota" incident in which he engaged with a couple of IAF Hawker Tempest while performing transport operations but still managing to bring 
back his Douglas DC-3. A founding father and former member of what is known now as Special Service Wing, Dogar is known to be instrumental in the creation of a special forces unit for the Pakistan Air Force called the Special Service Wing (SSW).

Early life and education
Mukhtar Ahmad Dogar was born in Hoshiarpur, Punjab, British India on 15 May 1922. He was the son of Hakim Ali Dogar. After basic education at his native town, Dogar gained a commission in Royal Air Force, and was accepted into the Royal Air Force Academy in Cranwell. After he graduated from the Academy, he gained his B.S. in Aerospace studies.

Service with the Air Force
After his education, Dogar joined the Royal Air Force and participated in 1945 Burma Campaign as a Flying officer.
After the independence of Pakistan,  Flying officer Dogar opted Pakistan's nationality, and was inherited in No. 5 Squadron Falcons. After Indian forces entered kashmir during the kashmir unrest, Dogar was stationed at Gilgit-Baltistan for air transport & supply services.
On 4 November 1948, Dogar was piloting a DC-3C transporter in the valleys of Kashmir when he was intercepted by two Indian Air Force (IAF) Hawker Tempest fighters. The Indian pilots ordered him to surrender and land at Srinagar. Though unarmed and unable to retaliate, the undaunted pilot refused to surrender and after 30 minutes of constant evasive maneuvers, he managed to take his plane back to Pakistan. Though one of the occupants on the plane later died due to bullet wounds sustained from the strafing IAF Fighters.

Kashmir Valley operations
The government of Pakistan had given orders to Pakistan Air Force (PAF) to stay away from the conflict. Pakistan, faced with limited aircraft and the hazardous weather, issued specific orders to PAF to not be involved in the conflict while the ground operations were undertaken by the Army. In the early morning of 4 November 1948, Dogar, along with Flying Officer Jagjivan, took off to Skardu to drop the military load to Pakistan Army. While returning to base, the pilots had spotted the IAF's Hawker Tempests, in a covert operation. At first, Dogar believed it was the Pakistani aircraft, but the pilots had not received any early warning from the Air Force control base.

Dogar continued tracking the IAF pilots. After 15 minutes, on the radio, the IAF Tempests pilots ordered Dogar and Jagjivan to go to the nearest Indian airfield but Dogar and Jagjivan gave no response to the order and continued flying to Risalpur Airbase. The order was repeated three times but the PAF pilots did not respond. Aggravated, the IAF pilots threatened to shoot down Dogar and Jagjivan if the orders weren't followed. The IAF pilots fired a free burst to show that they were armed. Dogar and Jagjivan tried to avoid to respond as they had been given orders by the Government of Pakistan. The army personnel on the ground had requested the pilots to ease off. Flying Officer Alfred Jagjivan and Naik Mohammad Din, however, stood watching from the open doorway of the aircraft, blissfully unaware of what was to come to them a minute later.

At this time, one of the Indian Air Force (IAF) pilots broke off, gained a little height and came in to attack. He fired a full burst of 20 mm at the PAF pilots, fatally wounding Naik Mohammad Din and knocking Jagjivan unconscious with a profusely bleeding arm. The encounter had lasted twenty to twenty-five minutes. Flying Officer Dogar began to retaliate with evasive maneuvers.Dogar kept on evading the Indian planes until they gave up. 

Air Commodore Dogar and Air Commodore Alfred Jagjivan were awarded the Sitara-e-Jurat for his daring handling of the belligerent Indian Air Force fighters on 4 November 1948. His Sitara-e-Jurat (Star of Courage) award was the first for Pakistan Air Force.

Indo-Pakistani War of 1965
Dogar, as Air Commodore (Brigadier-General, was serving as Air Commodore-in-Chief in PAF. Dogar had participated in Operation Gibraltar, and was instrumental in creating a special forces unit within the  Pakistan Air Force (PAF). Dogar was first who established and founded "Special Airwarfare Wing" (now-known as Special Service Wing), where he had served there as first Air Commodore-in-Chief. He played an important role, and headed the SAW until his retirement in 1968.

Career highlights
Dogar served on various command and staff assignments during his career in PAF, which included OC Flying Wing Lahore in 1956, Deputy Director Plans at AHQ in 1957, Director Operations at Pakistan International Airline (PIA) in 1960. He also was the Officer Commanding Dacca Base from 1960 to 1963. He commanded PAF Base, Chaklala and Peshawar as well.

A rare honour
Dogar was the only PAF officer who had flown such a large variety of aircraft during his long and illustrious service. He had flown more than 35 fighter, transport, light communication and bomber aircraft. Dogar retired from service in 1968.

Death and legacy
Mukhtar Ahmad Dogar died on 5 June 2004 and was buried at his native town Faisalabad, Punjab, Pakistan. His survivors included his wife and four children.

References

External links
Air Cdre Mukhtar Ahmad Dogar SJ | Ghazi of 1948 War

Members of the special forces units of Pakistan
Pakistan Air Force officers
Recipients of Sitara-e-Jurat
Graduates of the Royal Air Force College Cranwell
Pakistani flying aces
1922 births
2004 deaths
People from Faisalabad